Path 64 or the Marketplace - Adelanto line is a  500-kilovolt power line that runs from the Adelanto substation near Adelanto, California in the High Desert to the Marketplace substation near Boulder City, Nevada. Path 64 is part of The Western Electricity Coordinating Council's links of electrical intertie paths in the western United States. Path 64 is part of the Path 46 transmission system in southeastern California. This power line is operated by Los Angeles Department of Water and Power (LADWP). This line, along with Path 27, the Intermountain DC line and other Path 46 powerlines, supply over 10,000 megawatts of electrical power to the Los Angeles area. Path 64 is an essential line for powering Los Angeles.

Route
The 500 kV power line begins at the Adelanto substation, where two 500 kV lines from the San Fernando Valley and another from Victorville terminate. On top of that, this is where the Adelanto inverter station or the southern terminus of the HVDC Intermountain line (Path 27) is also located. As the line leaves Adelanto substation, the 500 kV line follows Highway 395 for a distance northwest. At Kramer Junction (intersection with State Route 58), the line turns east. The power line then meets the other Path 46 power lines from Victorville along with the Intermountain DC line near Newberry Springs and runs parallels with them for a short distance; all of the lines at this point are now heading northeast. After a few miles, the line crosses over the other Path 46 and Intermountain DC lines and splits off of the corridor; heading towards the Interstate 15 where it runs alongside the highway through the desert until both descend into the Ivanpah Valley. Just prior to the California-Nevada border, the Path 64 line crosses the Interstate 15 once more before turning north and entering Nevada southeast of Primm where it rejoins with the Path 46 and Intermountain lines again north of the community. The now scattered power lines then head in a roughly northeast direction across the desert to the Eldorado - Marketplace - McCullough substation complex. Path 64 ends at the Marketplace substation, where Path 63, another long-distance transmission line from Arizona also terminates.

Power transmission capacity
The lone 500 kV power line can transmit 1,200 MW of electrical power.

References

Western Interconnection
Energy infrastructure in California
Energy infrastructure in Nevada